Coldeportas Bicicletas Strongman was a UCI Continental team founded in 2015 and based in Colombia. It participates in UCI Continental Circuits races.

Team roster

Major wins 
2016
Pan American Road Race Championships, Jonathan Caicedo
Stage 10 Vuelta a Costa Rica, Carlos Becerra
Stage 12 Vuelta a Costa Rica, Jonathan Caicedo

2017
 Overall Vuelta a Colombia, Aristóbulo Cala

2018 
Gran Premio FECOCI, William David Muñoz 
Gran Premio Comite Olímpico Nacional, Oscar Adalberto Quiroz
Stage 8 Vuelta a Costa Rica, Johnatan Cañaveral
Stage 9 Vuelta a Costa Rica, Oscar Adalberto Quiroz
Stage 10 Vuelta a Costa Rica, Aristóbulo Cala

2019 
 National Road Race Championships, Oscar Adalberto Quiroz

National champions
2019
 Colombian Road Race, Oscar Adalberto Quiroz

References

UCI Continental Teams (America)
Cycling teams based in Colombia
Cycling teams established in 2016